David Eddison Bernard (born 19 July 1981) is a West Indian cricketer who has played for the West Indies in Tests and ODIs. He played his second Test for a weakened West Indies team on 9 July 2009. In the second Test he scored 17 and 69.

References

1981 births
Living people
Cricketers from Kingston, Jamaica
West Indies Test cricketers
West Indies One Day International cricketers
West Indies Twenty20 International cricketers
Jamaican cricketers
Jamaica Tallawahs cricketers
Jamaica cricketers
Jamaican cricket coaches
West Indies B cricketers